The Mina Mosque or the Heavenly Mosque was built by Shah Jahan between 1631 and 1640 near Diwan-i-Khas in Agra Fort. This  small mosque was built, entirely of white marble, by the Mughal king Shah Jahan for his personal use.

Architecture
It has a small open court in front of the three-arched prayer-chamber. There is no ornamentation and it is simple. It is enclosed and secured on all sides by high walls and, it appears that, Shah Jahan used this mosque during his imprisonment in the adjoining apartment of Musamman Burj, also called shah-burj, from 1658 to 1666 A.D.

See also
Moti Masjid (Agra Fort)
Nagina Masjid

External links
worldvisitguide.com
tsiindia.com 

Agra Fort
Mosques in Agra
1640 establishments in India
Mosques completed in 1640
Mughal mosques